Democratic Party of Federalists is political party in Bosnia and Herzegovina. It was founded in Sarajevo 2 May 1990 by Dragan Đokanović.
The headquarters of Democratic Party of Federalists, is located in City of East Sarajevo since 2010.

Dragan Đokanović established Democratic Party of Federalists in Belgrade, Serbia.
The party was officially registered in 2003.

The president of Democratic Party of Federalists is Dragan Đokanović.

Democratic Party of Federalists has participated in the proclamation of the Republic of Srpska
and has participated in creating the institutions of the Republic of Srpska.
President of Democratic Party of Federalists, Dragan Đokanović, was in the Presidency of the Republic of Srpska and he was a member of the Republic of Srpska Government.
Democratic Party of Federalists has left the alliance with Karadžić's Serbian Democratic Party for violation of the Geneva Conventions and the Constitution of the Republic of Srpska by the majority of Serbian Democratic Party.

References

External links
Official Website of Dragan Đokanović
Official Website of Democratic Party of Federalists
Official Website of Democratic Party of Federalists - East Sarajevo City

1990 establishments in Bosnia and Herzegovina
Political parties established in 1990
Pro-European political parties in Bosnia and Herzegovina
Serb political parties in Bosnia and Herzegovina